Dudley Ward may refer to:

 Freda Dudley Ward (1894-1983), mistress of the Prince of Wales from 1918 to 1923.
 General Sir Alfred Dudley Ward (1905–91), Governor of Gibraltar
 Dudley Ward (judge) (1827–1913), New Zealand judge and politician
 Viscounts Dudley and Ward, in the Peerage of the United Kingdom

See also
 Dudley Ward Way, a road tunnel through the south-eastern part of the Rock of Gibraltar